The Hôpital français de Hanoï, known in Vietnam under the name Bệnh viện Việt Pháp, formerly the Viet Nam International Hospital, is a privatised hospital in Hanoi, Vietnam, sold to a French company in September 2000. It is located at 1 Phuong Mai, Dong Da, Hanoi. Its staff include French and Vietnamese doctors.

History

The hospital was founded in 1997, as the Vietnam International Hospital, a joint venture between Bach Mai Hospital and an Australian company. In January 2000, the Australian company sold their share to French company Eukaria S.A. In September 2000 it was 100% privatised. It used to be the only international hospital in Vietnam.

The hospital is famous for fighting against the Severe acute respiratory syndrome (SARS) in 2003. Five of its staff died when treating patients but the disease was successfully isolated and stopped in Vietnam.

Services
They provide the following services: Accident & Emergency, Maternity, Ear-Nose-Throat & Cervico-Maxillo Facial Surgery, Orthopedics & Traumatology, Urology, Gastro - Enterology, Visceral Surgery, Neurosurgery, Ophthalmology, Cosmetic & Plastic surgery, and Dentistry.

Specialties
Anesthesiology & Reanimatio
Cardiology
Dentistry & Orthodontics
Dermatology & Venereology
ENT: Ear, Nose, Throat
Gastroenterology
General medicine
Neurosurgery
Neurology
Ophthalmology
Orthopaedics & Traumatology
Pediatrics
Pneumology & Allergology
Obstetrics & Gynaecology
Counselling & Psychiatry
Urology
Visceral surgery
Medical imaging

See also
List of hospitals in Vietnam

References

External links
 Official webpage

Hospital buildings completed in 1997
Hospitals in Hanoi
Hospitals established in 1997
Private hospitals in Vietnam